Centrostephanus asteriscus is a species of sea urchin of the family Diadematidae. Their armour is covered with spines. Centrostephanus asteriscus was first scientifically described in 1907 by Alexander Emanuel Agassiz & Hubert Lyman Clark.

References 

Diadematidae
Animals described in 1907
Taxa named by Alexander Agassiz
Taxa named by Hubert Lyman Clark